Bonnie Bullough (5 January 1927 in Delta, Utah – 12 April 1996) was an accomplished sexologist and author, who helped to develop the first Nurse Practitioner Program in California at UCLA in 1968. Throughout her career, she edited or wrote 30 books as well as 112 published articles.

Educational involvement 
Bullough finished her bachelor's degree in 1955, after working as a public health nurse in the Chicago Public Health Department while her husband, Vern Bullough, completed his doctorate. Bullough received her masters in nursing from The University of California- Los Angeles in 1959, followed by a masters and Ph.D. in sociology. After starting the first nurse practitioner program in California at UCLA, she went on to develop a masters program in nursing, one of the first in the United States. In 1975, she became the coordinator of graduate studies at California State University--Long Beach, directing nurse practitioner education. She became the dean of nursing at SUNY-Buffalo in 1979, and is considered a pioneer in the University of Buffalo School of Nursing.

Awards and accomplishments 
Nurse Practitioner of the Year - 1991
Alfred C. Kinsey Award - 1995
Founder of Nurse Practitioner Program at UCLA - 1969
Society for the Scientific Study of Sexuality Co-Founder

Legacy 
Bonnie Bullough's archives reside at the University Library at California State University, Northridge, where an endowment in her name funds special lectures, scholarships, and collection development in sex and gender studies.

Selected bibliography 
 Poverty, Ethnic Identity, and Health Care - 1972
 Sin, Sickness and Sanity: A History of Sexual Attitudes - 1977
 Prostitution: an Illustrated Social History - 1978
 Nursing: A Historical Bibliography - 1981
 Women and Prostitution: A Social History - 1987
 Cross Dressing, Sex, and Gender - 1993
 Human Sexuality: An Encyclopedia - 1994
 Nursing Issues for the Nineties and Beyond - 1994
 How I Got Into Sex - 1997
 Gender Blending - 1997
 Contraception: A Guide to Birth Control Methods - 1997

References

UCLA School of Nursing faculty
1927 births
1996 deaths
American sexologists
American nurses
American women nurses
UCLA School of Nursing alumni
People from Delta, Utah
University at Buffalo faculty
20th-century American women
20th-century American people
American women academics